This is a list of conflicts in Europe ordered chronologically, including wars between European states, civil wars within European states, wars between a European state and a non-European state that took place within Europe, and global conflicts in which Europe was a theatre of war.

There are various definitions of Europe and in particular, there is a significant dispute about the eastern and southeastern boundaries, specifically about how to define the countries of the former Soviet Union. This list is based on a wide definition that includes much of the interface between Europe and Western Asia.

BCE

Pre-500 BCE
c. 5000 BCE Talheim Death Pit
c. 1300 BCE Tollense valley battlefield
c. 1104–900 BCE Dorian invasion
c. 753–351 BCE Roman–Etruscan Wars
c. 753–494 BCE Roman–Sabine wars
743–724 BCE First Messenian War
710–650 BCE Lelantine War
circa 700–601 BCE Alban war with Rome
685–668 BCE Second Messenian War
669–668 BCE Sparta–Argos War
600–265 BCE Greek–Punic Wars
595–585 BCE First Sacred War
560 BCE Second Arcadian War
540 BCE Battle of Alalia
538–522 BCE Polycrates wars

500–200 BCE
509–396 BCE Early Italian campaigns
500–499 BCE Persian invasion of Naxos'
499–493 BCE Ionian Revolt
492–490 BCE First Persian invasion of Greece
482–479 BCE Second Persian invasion of Greece
480–307 BCE Sicilian Wars
460–445 BCE First Peloponnesian War
449–448 BCE Second Sacred War
440–439 BCE Samian War
431–404 BCE Second Peloponnesian War
395–387 BCE Corinthian War
390–387 BCE Celtic invasion of Italia
335 BCE Alexander's Balkan campaign
323–322 BCE Lamian War
280–275 BCE Pyrrhic War
267–261 BCE Chremonidean War
264–241 BCE First Punic War
229–228 BCE First Illyrian War
220–219 BCE Second Illyrian War
218–201 BCE Second Punic War
214–205 BCE First Macedonian War

200 BCE onwards
200–197 BCE Second Macedonian War
191–189 BCE Aetolian War
171–168 BCE Third Macedonian War
135–132 BCE First Servile War
113–101 BCE Cimbrian War
113 BCE – 476 CE Germanic Wars
104–100 BCE Second Servile War
91–87 BCE Social War
87 BCE Bellum Octavianum
85 BCE Colchis uprising against Pontus
80–72 BCE Sertorian War
82–81 BCE Sulla's civil war
77 BCE Marcus Aemilius Lepidus
73–71 BCE Third Servile War
73–63 BCE Roman Expansion in Syria & Judea
65–63 BCE Pompey's campaign in Caucasus
63–62 BCE Second Catilinarian conspiracy
55–54 BCE Caesar's invasions of Britain
58–51 BCE Gallic Wars
49–45 BCE Caesar's Civil War
42–36 BCE Bellum Siculum
43 BCE Battle of Mutina
43–42 BCE Liberators' civil war
41–40 BCE Perusine War
32–30 BCE Final War of the Roman Republic
29–19 BCE Cantabrian Wars 
12 BCE - 16 CE Early Germanic campaigns

1st–10th century CE

6–9 Bellum Batonianum 
21 Revolt of Sacrovir
49–96 Roman conquest of Britain
51 Armenian–Iberian war 
60–61 Boudica's uprising 
69 Year of the Four Emperors
69–70 Revolt of the Batavi
86–88 Domitian's Dacian War
101–106 Trajan's Dacian Wars
166–180 Marcomannic Wars
193 Year of the Five Emperors
208–210 Roman invasion of Caledonia
235–284 Crisis of the Third Century
238 Year of the Six Emperors
267–269 Gothic War (267–269)
274  Battle of Châlons
284–285 Roman civil war
306–324 Civil wars of the Tetrarchy
350–353 Roman civil war
356–378 Roman-Alamanni War
360–361 Roman civil war
367–368 Great Conspiracy
367–369 Gothic War (367–369)
376–382 Gothic War (376–382)
387–388 Roman civil war
394 Roman civil war (394)
398 Stilicho's Pictish War
401–403 Gothic War (401–403)
405–406 Radagaisus' Invasion of Italy
409–418 Gothic War (409–418)
455 Vandalic Sack of Rome
458 Gothic War (458)
461–476 Gothic War (461–476)
486 Battle of Soissons
526–532 Iberian War
535–554 Gothic War (535–554)
542–562 Lazic War
582–602 Maurice's Balkan campaigns
c. 600–793 Frisian–Frankish wars
650–799 Arab–Khazar wars
680–1355 “Byzantine”–Bulgarian wars
680 Battle of Ongal
695–717 Twenty Years' Anarchy
708 Byzantine–Bulgarian battle of Anchialus
711–718 Umayyad conquest of Hispania
715–718 Frankish Civil War (715–718)
717–718 Second Siege of Constantinople
722–1492 Reconquista
719–759 Umayyad invasion of Gaul
735–737 Marwan ibn Muhammad's invasion of Georgia
759 “Byzantine”-Bulgarian battle of the Rishki Pass
772–804 Saxon Wars
792 ”Byzantine”-Bulgarian battle of Marcellae
c. 800/862–973 Hungarian invasions of Europe
809 Siege of Serdica (Sofia)
811 “Byzantine”-Bulgarian battle of Vărbitsa Pass (Battle of Pliska)
813 “Byzantine”-Bulgarian battle of Versinikia
830s Paphlagonian expedition of the Rus'
839–1330 Bulgarian–Serb Wars (medieval)
839–842 Bulgarian–Serb War (839–842)
853 Bulgarian–Serb War (853)
917–924 Bulgarian–Serb wars of 917–924
854–1000 Croatian–Bulgarian wars
854 Croatian–Bulgarian battle of 854
926 Croatian–Bulgarian battle of 926
998 Siege of Zadar
860 Rus'–Byzantine War (860)
865–878 Invasion of the Great Heathen Army
880–1380 Bulgarian–Hungarian wars
896 Battle of Southern Buh
894–896 Byzantine–Bulgarian war of 894–896
907 Rus'–Byzantine War (907)
913–927 Byzantine–Bulgarian war of 913–927
917 Battle of Achelous
914 Arab-Georgian War
939 Battle of Andernach
941 Rus'–Byzantine War (941)
955 Battle of Recknitz
967/968–971 Sviatoslav's invasion of Bulgaria
982 Battle of Stilo
983 Great Slav Rising
986 Battle of the Gates of Trajan

11th century

1002–1018 German–Polish War
1014–1208 Byzantine–Georgian wars
1014 Battle of Kleidion
1015–1016 Pisan–Genoese expeditions to Sardinia
1015–1016 Cnut's invasion of England
1018 Battle of Vlaardingen
1018 Byzantine conquest of Bulgaria
1024 Battle of Listven
1024 Rus'–Byzantine War
1040-1041 Bulgarian Uprising of Peter Delyan
1043 Rus'–Byzantine War
1044 Battle of Ménfő
1046 Vata pagan uprising
1048–1064 Invasion of Denmark
1050–1185 Byzantine–Norman wars
1051-1052 German-Hungarian War
1057 Battle of Petroe
1060 Battle of the Theben Pass
1063 German invasion of Hungary
1065–1067 War of the Three Sanchos
1066 Norwegian invasion of England
1066–1088 Norman conquest of England
1067–1194 Norman invasion of Wales
1067 Battle on the Nemiga River
1068 Pecheneg invasion of Hungary
1068 Battle of the Alta River
1072 Bulgarian Uprising of Georgi Voyteh
1073–1075 Saxon Rebellion
1074 Hungarian Civil War
1075 Revolt of the Earls
1077–1088 Great Saxon Revolt
1078 Battle of Kalavrye
1088 Rebellion of 1088
1091 Hungarian occupation of Croatia
1093 Battle of Schmilau
1093 Battle of the Stugna River
1097 Battle of Gvozd Mountain
1099–1204 Georgian–Seljuk wars

12th century
 
1109 Battle of Głogów
1115 Battle of Welfesholz
1121 Battle of Didgori
1126 Battle of Chlumec
1125–1186 Guelphs and Ghibellines
1127–1129 Byzantine-Hungarian War
1130–1240 Civil war era in Norway
1135–1153 The Anarchy
1142–1445 Swedish–Novgorodian Wars
1144–1162 Baussenque Wars
1146 Battle of the Fischa
1159–1345 Wars of the Guelphs and Ghibellines
1164 Battle of Verchen
1167 Battle of Sirmium
1169–1175 Norman invasion of Ireland
1173–1174 Revolt of 1173–74
1185–1204 Uprising of Asen and Peter
1198 Battle of Gisors
1198–1290 Livonian Crusade
1198–1215 German throne dispute

13th century

1201 Battle of Stellau
1202 Siege of Zadar
1202–1214 Anglo-French War
1204-1261 Nicaean–Latin wars
1205 Battle of Serres (1205)
1205 Battle of Zawichost
1205 Battle of Adrianople (1205)
1206 Battle of Rodosto
1206 Battle of Rusion
1207 Battle of Messinopolis
1208 Battle of Beroia (1208)
1208 Battle of Philippopolis (1208)
1208–1227 Conquest of Estonia
1209–1229 Albigensian Crusade
1211 Welsh uprising of 1211
1215–1217 First Barons' War
1216–1392 Guelphs and Ghibellines
1216–1222 War of Succession of Champagne
1220–1264 Age of the Sturlungs
1223–1241 Mongol invasion of Europe
1223–1480 Tatar raids against Rus'
1224 Siege of La Rochelle
1227 Battle of Bornhöved
1228-1230 War of the Keys
1230 Battle of Klokotnitsa
1231–1233 Friso-Drentic War
1234–1238 Georgian-Mongol War
1235 Siege of Constantinople (1235)
1239–1245 Teltow War
1241-1242 First Mongol invasion of Hungary
1242-1243 Mongol invasion of Bulgaria and Serbia
1242 Saintonge War
1242–1249 Prussian uprisings
1246–1282 War of the Babenberg Succession
1256–1258 War of the Euboeote Succession
1256–1381 Venetian–Genoese Wars
1256–1422 Friso-Hollandic Wars
1260 Battle of Kressenbrunn
1260–1274 Prussian uprisings
1262–1266 Scottish–Norwegian War
1264–1267 Second Barons' War
1264–1265 Hungarian Civil War
1275–1276 The war against Valdemar Birgersson
1276–1278 6000-mark war
1276 War of Navarra
1277–1280 Uprising of Ivaylo
1278 Battle on the Marchfeld
1282 Cumanic uprising in Hungary
1282–1302 War of the Sicilian Vespers
1283–1289 War of the Limburg Succession
1284–1285 Aragonese Crusade
1285-1286 Second Mongol invasion of Hungary
1288–1295 War of the Outlaws
1296–1357 Wars of Scottish Independence
1297–1305 Franco-Flemish War
1298 Battle of Göllheim

14th century

1301-1308 Hungarian Interregnum
1302 Battle of the Golden Spurs
1304 Battle of Skafida
1304–1310 The Swedish brother's feud
1307 Battle of Lucka
1311 Battle of Halmyros
1311–1312 Rebellion of mayor Albert
1312 Battle of Rozgony
1321–1322 Despenser War
1321–1328 Byzantine civil war of 1321–28
1322 Battle of Bliska
1323–1328 Peasant revolt in Flanders
1324 War of Saint-Sardos
1326–1332 Polish–Teutonic War
1330 Hungarian-Wallachian War
1332 Battle of Rusokastro
1333–1338 Burke Civil War
1337–1453 Hundred Years' War
1340–1392 Galicia–Volhynia Wars
1341–1347 Byzantine civil war of 1341–47
1342–1350 Zealot's Rebellion
1343–1345 St. George's Night Uprising
1345-1396 Bulgarian–Ottoman wars
1345 Battle of Peritheorion
1355 Battle of Ihtiman
1382/1385 Siege of Sofia
1396 Battle of Nicopolis
1347–1352 Neapolitan campaigns of Louis the Great
1350–1498 Wars of the Vetkopers and Schieringers
1350–1490 Hook and Cod wars
1356–1358 Jacquerie
1356–1375 War of the Two Peters
1362 Battle of Helsingborg
1362–1457 War of the Bands
1366-1367 Savoyard crusade
1366–1369 Castilian Civil War
1366–1526 Hungarian-Ottoman Wars
1366-1367 Savoyard crusade
1369–1370 First Fernandine War
1371–1413 Serbian–Ottoman wars
1371 Battle of Maritsa
1385/1387 Battle of Pločnik
1371 Battle of Baesweiler
1371–1379 War of the Guelderian Succession
1371–1381 War of Chioggia
1372–1373 Second Fernandine War
1373–1379 Byzantine civil war of 1373–79
1375 Gugler War
1375–1378 War of the Eight Saints
1381 Peasants' Revolt
1381–1382 Third Fernandine War
1381–1384 Lithuanian Civil War (1381–84)
1382 Harelle and Maillotins Revolt
1381–1404 Second Georgian–Mongol War
1383-1385 Invasion of Portugal by Castille – Battle of Aljubarrota, 14 August 1385
1387 Battle of Margate
1389 Battle of Kosovo
1389–1392 Lithuanian Civil War (1389–92)
1396 Battle of Nicopolis

15th century

1400–1415 Glyndŵr Rising
1401–1429 Appenzell Wars
1407–1468 Georgian-Turkoman War
1409–1411 Polish–Lithuanian–Teutonic War
1410–1435 War of Slesvig
1414 Hunger War
1419–1434 Hussite Wars
1422 Gollub War
1422 Battle of Arbedo
1425–1454 Wars in Lombardy
1431–1435 Polish–Teutonic War
1434–1436 Engelbrekt rebellion
1437 Budai Nagy Antal revolt
1438–1556 Russo-Kazan Wars
1440–1446 Old Zürich War
1441 Battle of Samobor
1443–1444 Long campaign
1444 Battle of Varna
1445 First Battle of Olmedo
1447–1448 Albanian–Venetian War
1449–1450 First Margrave War
1449 Battle of Castione
1449–1453 Revolt of Ghent
1450 Jack Cade's Rebellion
1451–1455 Navarrese Civil War
1453–1454 Morea revolt
1454–1466 Thirteen Years' War
1455–1485 Wars of the Roses
1462–1485 Rebellion of the Remences
1462–1472 Catalan Civil War
1463–1479 Venetian-Ottoman War
1465 Battle of Montlhéry
1465–1468 Wars of Liège
1466–1469 Irmandiño Wars
1467 Second Battle of Olmedo
1467 Hungarian - Moldavian war
1467–1479 War of the Priests
1468 Waldshut War
1468–1478 Bohemian War
1470–1471 Dano-Swedish War
1470–1474 Anglo-Hanseatic War
1474-1477 Burgundian_Wars
1475–1479 War of the Castilian Succession
1477–1488 Austrian–Hungarian War (1477–88)
1478 Carinthian Peasant Revolt
1478 Battle of Giornico
1479 Battle of Guinegate
1482–1484 War of Ferrara
1484 Battle of Lochmaben Fair
1485–1488 Mad War
1487 Battle of Crevola
1487 War of Rovereto
1488 Battle of Sauchieburn
1490-91 War of the Hungarian Succession
1492–1583 Muscovite–Lithuanian Wars
1493 Battle of Krbava Field
1493–1593 Hundred Years' Croatian–Ottoman War
1494–1498 Italian War of 1494–98
1495–1497 Russo-Swedish War
1497 Cornish Rebellion of 1497
1497 Battle of Rotebro
1499 Swabian War
1499–1504 Italian War of 1499–1504 –  20,000 killed in action

16th century

c. 1500–1854 Lekianoba
1501-1512 Dano-Swedish War (1501–12)
1502–1543 Guelders Wars
1503–1505 War of the Succession of Landshut
1508–1516 War of the League of Cambrai – 31,000 killed in action
1509–1510 Polish–Moldavian War
1514 Poor Conrad's Rebellion
1514 Dózsa rebellion
1514–1517 Saxon feud
1515 Slovene Peasant Revolt
1515–1523 Frisian peasant rebellion
1519–1521 Polish–Teutonic War
1520–1521 Revolt of the Comuneros
1521–1523 Revolt of the Brotherhoods
1521–1523 Swedish War of Liberation
1521–1526 Italian War of 1521–1526 – 30,000 killed in action
1521–1791 Habsburg-Ottoman Wars
1522–1523 Knights' Revolt
1524–1525 German Peasants' War
1526 Battle of Mohács
1526 Revolt of Espadán
1526–1530 War of the League of Cognac – 18,000 killed in action
1526-1538 Hungarian Civil War
1526-1527 Jovan Nenad uprising
1529 First War of Kappel
1531 Second War of Kappel
1531-1532 War of Two Kings
1534 Silken Thomas Rebellion
1534–1535 Münster Rebellion
1534–1536 Count's Feud
1536-1537 Reformation in Norway
1536–1537 Pilgrimage of Grace
1540 Salt War
1542–1546 Italian War of 1542–1546 – 47,000 killed in action
1542–1543 Dacke War
1543 Siege of Esztergom
1543–1550 Rough Wooing
1546–1547 Schmalkaldic War
1549 Kett's Rebellion
1549 Prayer Book Rebellion
1550 Battle of Sauðafell
1551–1559 Italian War of 1551–1559 – 75,000 killed in action
1552–1555 Second Margrave War
1554 Wyatt's rebellion
1554–1557 Russo-Swedish War
1558–1583 Livonian War
1559–1564 Spanish-Ottoman War – 24,000 killed in action
1560 Siege of Leith
1562–1598 French Wars of Religion
1563–1570 Northern Seven Years' War
1565 Great Siege of Malta
1566 Siege of Szigetvár
1568–1570 Morisco Revolt
1568–1648 Eighty Years' War
1569–1580 Spanish-Ottoman War – 48,000 killed in action
1569–1570 Rising of the North
1569–1573 First Desmond Rebellion
1573 Croatian–Slovene Peasant Revolt
1578 Georgian-Ottoman War
1579–1583 Second Desmond Rebellion
1580–1583 War of the Portuguese Succession
1583–1588 Cologne War
1585–1604 English-Spanish War – 48,000 killed in action
1588–1654 Dutch–Portuguese War
1587–1588 War of the Polish Succession
1590–1595 Russo-Swedish War
1593 Battle of Sisak
1593–1606 Thirteen Years' War
1593–1617 Moldavian Magnate Wars
1594–1603 Nine Years' War (Ireland)
1595–1621 Moldavian Magnate Wars
1596–1597 Cudgel War
1598 First Tarnovo uprising
1598–1599 War against Sigismund

17th century

1600–1629 Polish–Swedish War
1602 Savoyard escalade of Geneva
1604-1606 Bocskai Uprising
1605–1618 Polish–Muscovite War
1606–1607 Bolotnikov Rebellion
1606–1608 Zebrzydowski Rebellion
1610–1614 Spanish-Ottoman War – 15,000 killed in action
1610–1617 Ingrian War
1611–1613 Kalmar War
1615–1618 Uskok War
1615–1617 Spanish-Savoian War – 2,000 killed in action
1617–1621 Spanish-Venetian War – 5,000 killed in action
1618–1619 Spanish-Ottoman War – 6,000 killed in action
1618–1648 Thirty Years' War
1624–1625 Siege of Breda – Spain vs. Holland, England
1635 Siege of Leuven – Spain vs. Holland, France
1637 Battle off Lizard Point – Spain vs. Holland
1638 Battle of Getaria – France vs. Spain
1639 Battle of the Downs – Spain vs. Holland
1643 Battle of Rocroi – France vs. Spain
1648 Battle of Lens – France vs. Spain
1618–1639 Bündner Wirren
1620–1621 Polish–Ottoman War
1625 Zhmaylo Uprising
1627–1629 Anglo-French War
1628–1631 War of the Mantuan Succession
1630 Fedorovych Uprising
1632–1634 Smolensk War
1637 Pavlyuk Uprising
1638 Ostryanyn Uprising
1639–1653 Wars of the Three Kingdoms
1639-1640 Bishops' Wars
1641-1653 Irish Confederate Wars
1642-1651 English Civil War
1642-1646 First English Civil War
1648-1649 Second English Civil War
1649-1651 Third English Civil War
1649-1653 Cromwellian conquest of Ireland
1640–1668 Spanish-Portuguese War – 80,000 killed in action
1648–1659 Franco-Spanish War – 108,000 killed in action
1648–1657 Khmelnytsky Uprising
1651 Kostka-Napierski Uprising
1651–1986 Three Hundred and Thirty Five Years' War
1652–1674 Anglo-Dutch Wars
1653 Swiss peasant war of 1653
1654 First Bremian War
1654–1667 Russo-Polish War
1654–1660 English-Spanish War – 15,000 killed in action
1655–1660 Second Northern War
1656 War of Villmergen
1666 Second Bremian War
1666–1671 Polish–Cossack–Tatar War
1667–1668 War of Devolution – 4,000 killed in action
1670–1671 Razin's Rebellion
1672 First Kuruc Uprising
1672–1678 Franco-Dutch War – 342,000 killed in action
1672–1673 Second Genoese–Savoyard War
1675–1679 Scanian War
1676–1681 Russo-Ottoman War
1678–1685 Thököly Uprising
1679 Covenanter Rebellion
1683–1684 War of the Reunions – 5,000 killed in action
1683–1699 War of the Holy League – 384,000 killed in action
1685 Monmouth Rebellion
1686 Second Tarnovo uprising
1688 Chiprovtsi uprising
1688–1697 Nine Years' War – 680,000 killed in action
1688 Glorious Revolution
1689 Karposh's rebellion
1689–1692 First Jacobite Rising

18th century

1700 Lithuanian Civil War
1700–1721 Great Northern War – 30,000 Russians killed in action
1701–1713 War of the Spanish Succession – 1,251,000 killed in action
1703–1711 Rákóczi's War of Independence
1707–1708 Bulavin Rebellion
1712 Toggenburg War
1714–1718 Venetian-Ottoman War
1715–1716 Jacobite rising of 1715
1718–1720 War of the Quadruple Alliance – 25,000 killed in action
1722–1723 Russo-Persian War
1727–1729 British-Spanish War – 15,000 killed in action
1733–1738 War of the Polish Succession – 88,000 killed in action
1735–1739 Russo-Ottoman War
1740–1748 War of the Austrian Succession – 359,000 killed in action
1740–1763 Silesian Wars
1741–1743 Russo-Swedish War
1745–1746 Jacobite rising of 1745
1756–1763 Seven Years' War – 992,000 killed in action
1757 Battle of Khresili
1763–1864 Russo-Circassian War
1768–1772 War of the Bar Confederation
1768–1774 Russo-Ottoman War
1770 Battle of Aspindza
1770  Orlov Revolt
1774–1775 Pugachev's Rebellion
1775–1783 American Revolutionary War
1778–1779 War of the Bavarian Succession
1784 Kettle War
1784–1785 Revolt of Horea, Cloșca and Crișan
1785 Battle of the Sunja
1787 Dutch Patriot Revolt
1787–1792 Russo-Ottoman War
1788–1790 Russo-Swedish War
1790 Saxon Peasants' Revolt
1792 Polish–Russian War of 1792
1792–1802 French Revolutionary Wars – 663,000 killed in action
1794 Kościuszko Uprising
1795 Battle of Krtsanisi
1798 Irish Rebellion of 1798
1798 Peasants' War

19th century

1803 Irish Rebellion of 1803
1803 Souliote War
1803–1815 Napoleonic Wars
1804–1813 First Serbian Uprising
1804–1813 Russo-Persian War
1806–1812 Russo-Ottoman War
1808–1809 Finnish War
1809 Polish–Austrian War
1815–1817 Second Serbian Uprising
1817–1864 Russian conquest of the Caucasus
1821-1829 Greek War of Independence
1821 Wallachian uprising
1823 French invasion of Spain
1826–1828 Russo-Persian War
1827 War of the Malcontents
1828–1829 Russo-Ottoman War
1828–1834 Liberal Wars
1830 July Revolution
1831  Ten Days' Campaign (following the Belgian Revolution)
1830–1831 November Uprising
1831 Canut revolts
1831–1832 Bosnian Uprising
1831–1836 Tithe War
1832 War in the Vendée and Chouannerie of 1832
1832 June Rebellion
1833–1839 First Carlist War
1833–1839 Albanian Revolts of 1833–39
1843–1844 Albanian Revolt of 1843–44
1846 Galician slaughter
1846–1849 Second Carlist War
1847 Albanian Revolt of 1847
1847 Sonderbund War
1848–1849 Hungarian Revolution and War of Independence
1848–1851 First Schleswig War
1848–1849 First Italian War of Independence
1853–1856 Crimean War
1854 Epirus Revolt of 1854
1858 Mahtra War
1859 Second Italian War of Independence
1861–62 Montenegrin–Ottoman War
1863–1864 January Uprising
1864 Second Schleswig War
1866 Austro-Prussian War
1866–1869 Cretan Revolt
1866 Third Italian War of Independence
1867 Fenian Rising
1870–1871 Franco-Prussian War
1872–1876 Third Carlist War
1873–1874 Cantonal Revolution
1875–77 Herzegovina Uprising
1876–78 Serbian–Ottoman War
1876 Bulgarian April Uprising
1876 Razlovtsi insurrection
1876–78 Montenegrin–Ottoman War
1877–1878 Russo-Ottoman War
1878-1879 Kresna–Razlog uprising
1878 Epirus Revolt of 1878
1885 Bulgarian unification
1885 Serbo-Bulgarian War
1897 Thirty Days' War

20th century

1903 Ilinden–Preobrazhenie Uprising
1904–1908 Macedonian Struggle
1904–1905 Russo-Japanese War
1905 Łódź insurrection
1905 Revolution of 1905
1906–1908 Theriso revolt
1907 1907 Romanian Peasants' Revolt
1910 Albanian Revolt of 1910
1910 5 October 1910 revolution
1911 Albanian Revolt of 1911
1911–1912 Italo-Turkish War
1912 Albanian Revolt of 1912
1912–1913 Balkan Wars
1912–1913 First Balkan War
1913 Tikveš Uprising
1913 Second Balkan War
1913 Ohrid–Debar Uprising
1914 Peasant Revolt in Albania
1914–1918 World War I - 19,174,335 deaths
1916 Noemvriana
1917 Toplica Uprising
1918 Judenburg mutiny
1918 Cattaro Mutiny
1918 Aster Revolution
1918 Radomir Rebellion
1918 Finnish Civil War
1916 Easter Rising
1917 Russian Revolution
1917 February Revolution
1917 July Days
1917 Polubotkivtsi uprising
1917 Kornilov affair
1917 October Revolution
1917 Junker mutiny
1917 Kerensky–Krasnov uprising
1917–1921 Russian Civil War
1917–1918 Red Army invasion of Georgia
1917–1921 Ukrainian War of Independence
1917–1921 Ukrainian–Soviet War
1918–1919 Polish–Ukrainian War
1918–1924 Left-wing uprisings against the Bolsheviks
1918 Left SR uprising
1921 Kronstadt rebellion
1918–1922 Heimosodat
1918 Viena expedition
1918 Aunus expedition
1918–1920 Petsamo expeditions
1918–1920 National revolt of Ingrian Finns
1921–1922 East Karelian Uprising
1918–1920 Estonian War of Independence
1918–1925 Allied intervention in the Russian Civil War
1918–1920 North Russia Intervention
1918–1922 Siberian Intervention
1918 Georgian–Armenian War
1918–1920 Georgian–Ossetian conflict (1918–20)
1918–1919 Georgian-Russian conflict over Sochi
1918–1920 Armenian–Azerbaijani War
1918–1920 Latvian War of Independence
1918–1920 Lithuanian Wars of Independence
1918–1919 Lithuanian–Soviet War
1919 Lithuanian War of Independence (War against the Bermontians)
1920 Polish–Lithuanian War
1919–1921 Polish–Soviet War
1921 Georgian–Russian War
1924 Georgian Uprising against Soviet Union
1919–1920 Revolutions and interventions in Hungary (1918–20)
1918–1919 Hungarian–Romanian War
1918–1919 Hungarian–Czechoslovak War
1919 Sejny Uprising
1919 Khotyn Uprising
1918–1919 Austro-Slovene conflict in Carinthia
1918–1958 Polish–Czechoslovak border conflicts
1919 Polish-Czech war for Teschen Silesia
1918–1919 German Revolution
1918–1919 Greater Poland Uprising
1919–1922 Greco-Turkish War
1918–1921 Franco-Turkish War
1920 Armenian-Turkish War
1919 Christmas Uprising
1919–1920 Unrest in Split
1919–1921 Silesian Uprisings
1919 First Silesian Uprising
1920 Second Silesian Uprising
1921 Third Silesian Uprising
1919–1922 Irish War of Independence
1920 Husino rebellion
1920 Vlora War
1920 Kapp Putsch
1920 Ruhr Uprising
1920 Slutsk Defence Action
1920–1924 Biennio Rosso
1921 Uprising in West Hungary
1921 February Uprising
1921 Charles IV of Hungary's attempts to retake the throne
1922–1923 Irish Civil War
1923 Corfu incident
1923 September Uprising
1923 Klaipėda Revolt
1923 Leonardopoulos–Gargalidis coup d'état attempt
1924 1924 Estonian coup d'état attempt
1924 August Uprising
1925 Incident at Petrich
1932 Mäntsälä rebellion
1933 Casas Viejas incident
1933 Anarchist uprising in Spain (1933)
1934 Asturian miners' strike of 1934
1934 Austrian Civil War
1935 1935 Greek coup d'état attempt
1936–1939 Spanish Civil War
1938 1938 Greek coup d'état attempt
1939 German occupation of Czechoslovakia
1939 Hungarian invasion of Carpatho-Ukraine
1939 Italian invasion of Albania
1939–1965 Spanish Maquis
1939-1940 S-Plan
1939–1945 World War II
1939 Nazi German invasion of Poland
1939 Soviet invasion of Poland
1939–1940 Winter War(Soviet invasion of Finland) 
1940 Phoney War 
1940 Operation Weserübung
1940 Norwegian campaign
1940 Invasion of Luxembourg
1940 Battle of the Netherlands
1940 Battle of Belgium
1940 Battle of France
1940 Italian invasion of France
1940 Soviet invasion of the Baltic States
1940 Soviet occupation of Bessarabia and Northern Bukovina
1940 Battle of Britain
1940–1941 Greco-Italian War
1941–1945 Soviet–German War
1941–1945 Yugoslav anti-fascist resistance movement
1941–1944 Continuation War
1941 Uprising in Montenegro
1942 Case Blue
1942-1944 Northern Campaign
1942–1956 Ukrainian Insurgent Army
1943 Italian Campaign
1944 Operation Market Garden
1944 Warsaw Uprising
1944 Western Allied invasion of Germany
1944-1945 Lapland War
1944-1945 Slovak National Uprising
1944-1945 Liberation of France
1944-1945 Battle of the Bulge
1945 Second Battle of the Alps 
1945 Battle of Berlin
1944–1956 Guerrilla war in the Baltic states
1945–1949 Greek Civil War
1946–1948 Corfu Channel incident
1947–1962 Romanian anti-communist resistance movement
1953 Uprising in East Germany
1955-1959 Cyprus Emergency
1956 Uprising in Poznań
1956 Hungarian Revolution
1956–1962 Operation Harvest
1958 First Cod War
1959–2011 Basque conflict
1967 Greek coup d'état
1968 Warsaw Pact invasion of Czechoslovakia
1968–1998 The Troubles
1970–1984 Unrest in Italy
1972–1973 Second Cod War
1974 Turkish invasion of Cyprus
1974 Carnation Revolution
1975–1976 Third Cod War
1976–2016 Corsican conflict
1981 Spanish coup d'état attempt
1986 Evros River incident
1989 Romanian Revolution
1990–1991 Soviet attacks on Lithuanian border posts
1990 Transnistria conflict
1990–1992 Transnistria War
1991 January Events
1991 The Barricades
1990 Log Revolution
1991–2001 Yugoslav Wars
1991 Ten-Day War 
1991–1995 Croatian War of Independence
1992–1995 Bosnian War
1992–1994 Croat–Bosniak War
1998–1999 Kosovo War 
1999–2001 Insurgency in the Preševo Valley
2001 2001 insurgency in Macedonia
1991–1992 Georgian war against Russo-Ossetian alliance
1991–1993 Georgian Civil War
1992 East Prigorodny Conflict
1992–1993 War in Abkhazia
1993 1993 Cherbourg incident
1993 1993 Russian constitutional crisis
1995–1996 Imia/Kardak military crisis
1997–1998 Cyprus Missile Crisis
1997 Albanian civil war of 1997
1997–present Dissident Irish Republican campaign
1998 Six-Day War of Abkhazia

21st century

2001 Georgia, Kodori crisis
2001 Insurgency in the Republic of Macedonia
2004–2013 Unrest in Kosovo
2004 2004 unrest in Kosovo
2008 2008 unrest in Kosovo
2011–2013 North Kosovo crisis
2004 Georgia, Adjara crisis
2004 Georgia, South Ossetia clashes
2006 Georgia, Kodori crisis
2008 Russo-Georgian war
2014–present Russo-Ukrainian War (outline)
2014 Pro-Russian unrest in Ukraine
2014–present Annexation of Crimea by the Russian Federation
2014–present Russo-Ukrainian War
2021–2022 Russo-Ukrainian crisis
2022–present Russian invasion of Ukraine

Ongoing conflicts

See also
 Outline of war § History of war – a complete global listing
 List of conflicts in North America
 List of conflicts in Central America
 List of conflicts in South America
 List of conflicts in Africa
 List of conflicts in Asia
 List of conflicts in the Near East
 List of conflicts in the Middle East
 List of wars involving Rome
 List of wars involving England and France
 List of wars in Great Britain and in Ireland
 List of wars involving Bulgaria

References

Conflicts
Conflicts
Conflicts
Europe